Cethosia, commonly called the lacewings, is a genus of butterflies of the subfamily Heliconiinae in the family Nymphalidae. They are found mainly in southeastern Asia as far south as Australia.

Species
Listed alphabetically:
Cethosia biblis (Drury, [1773]) – red lacewing, common lacewing, or batik lacewing
Cethosia cyane (Drury, [1773]) – leopard lacewing
Cethosia cydippe (Linnaeus, 1767) – eastern red lacewing
Cethosia hypsea Doubleday, [1847]
 Cethosia hypsea hypsina (C. & R. Felder, 1867) – Malay lacewing
Cethosia lamarcki Godart, 1819
Cethosia luzonica C. & R. Felder, 1863 – Luzon lacewing
Cethosia myrina C. & R. Felder, [1867] – violet lacewing
Cethosia nietneri C. & R. Felder, [1867] – Tamil lacewing
Cethosia obscura Guérin-Méneville, [1830]
Cethosia penthesilea (Cramer, [1777])
 C. p. methypsea (Butler, 1879) – plain lacewing
 C. p. paksha (Fruhstorfer, 1905) – orange lacewing

Incertae sedis
Cethosia moesta C. & R. Felder, [1867]
Cethosia lechenaulti Godart, [1824]
Cethosia gabinia Weymer, 1883
Cethosia vasilia Müller, 1999

References

 Parsons M. (1999). The Butterflies of Papua New Guinea: Their Systematics and Biology. Academic Press, San Diego.
 Vane-Wright RI, and de Jong R. (2003). The butterflies of Sulawesi: annotated checklist for a critical island fauna. Zoologische Verhandelingen 343: 1-267. PDF

External links
Images representing Cethosia at EOL
Images representing Cethosia at Consortium for the Barcode of Life

Heliconiini
Nymphalidae genera
Taxa named by Johan Christian Fabricius